Makoto Yano (矢野誠, Yano Makoto, born 27 May 1952) is a Japanese economist, currently the President and Chief Research Officer of the Research Institute of Economy, Trade and Industry (RIETI). He is also a Professor Emeritus at Kyoto University and a Professor by Special Appointment at Kyoto University's Institute of Economic Research and Sophia University.

Biography
Yano completed undergraduate study at Tokyo University in 1977 before moving to the United States to pursue graduate studies at the University of Rochester. At Rochester, he focused on dynamic general equilibrium theory and trade theory, working with Lionel W. McKenzie and Ronald. W. Jones as his thesis advisors. After receiving his Ph.D. from Rochester in 1981, Yano taught at Cornell University and Rutgers University before returning to Japan in 1986.  Before assuming his current position with RIETI, he spent more than ten years as a Professor at Kyoto University's Institute of Economic Research Institute, including two years as Chair of the Institute and five years as Head of the Institute's Research Center for Advanced Policy Studies.Before joining Kyoto University, he also served as a Professor on the Faculties of Economics at Keio University and Yokohama National University. He is a founding editor of the International Journal of Economic Theory, and has served as President of the Japanese Economic Association from April 1, 2008 to  March 31, 2009 and as Managing Editor of the Japanese Economic Review.

Contributions 
Yano is known for his contributions in the field of dynamic general equilibrium theory (Turnpike theory). He is also known for his work in incorporating chaos theory into economic theory. In recent years, he has developed a new field of market quality economics that measures the efficiency of allocation and the fairness of dealing and pricing.

Selected Publications
1. Yano, M., "The Foundation of Market Quality Economics," Japanese Economic Review 60–1, 2009.  

2. Yano, M., and J. Nugent, "Aid, Non-Traded Goods and the Transfer Paradox in Small Countries," American Economic Review 89–3, 431–449, 1999.

3. Yano, M., "On the Dual Stability of a von Neumann Facet and the Inefficacy of Temporary Fiscal Policy,"  Econometrica 66–2, 1998.

4. Nishimura, K., and M. Yano. "Non-Linear Dynamics and Chaos in Optimal Growth: An Example,"  Econometrica 63–4, 1995.

5. Weller, P., and M. Yano. "Forward Exchange, Futures Trading and Spot Price Variability: A General Equilibrium Approach," Econometrica 55–6, 1433–1450, 1987.

6. Yano, M., "The Turnpike of Dynamic General Equilibrium Paths in Its Insensitivity to Initial Conditions,"  Journal of Mathematical Economics 13–3, 235–254.  

7. McKenzie, L., and M. Yano, "Turnpike Theory: Some Corrections,"  Econometrica 48, 1980.

External links 
・Personal web page

・Yano Makoto's page at RIETI

References 

Living people
1952 births